The Chukchi Peninsula (also Chukotka Peninsula or Chukotski Peninsula; , Chukotskiy poluostrov, short form , Chukotka), at about 66° N 172° W, is the easternmost peninsula of Asia. Its eastern end is at Cape Dezhnev near the village of Uelen. The peninsula is part of Chukotka Autonomous Okrug of Russia.

The peninsula is traditionally the home of tribes of the indigenous peoples of Siberia as well as some Russian settlers. It lies along the Northern Sea Route, or Northeast Passage. Industries on the peninsula are mining (tin, lead, zinc, gold, and coal), hunting and trapping, reindeer raising, and fishing.

In the Bering Strait about halfway between the peninsula and the Seward Peninsula are the fairly small Diomede Islands; the western one is Big Diomede, Russia and the eastern one is Little Diomede Island, Alaska.

See also 
 Arctic Alaska-Chukotka terrane
 Providence Bay
 Chukotka sled-dog

References

Further reading 
 Aĭnana, L., and Richard L. Bland. Umiak the traditional skin boat of the coast dwellers of the Chukchi Peninsula : compiled in the communities of Provideniya and Sireniki, Chukotka Autonomous Region, Russia 1997-2000. Anchorage: U.S. Dept. of the Interior, National Park Service, 2003. 
 Dinesman, Lev Georgievich. Secular dynamics of coastal zone ecosystems of the northeastern Chukchi Peninsula Chukotka : cultural layers and natural depositions from the last millennia. Tübingen [Germany]: Mo Vince, 1999.  
 Dikov, Nikolaĭ Nikolaevich. Asia at the Juncture with America in Antiquity The Stone Age of the Chukchi Peninsula. St. Petersburg: "Nauka", 1993. 
 Frazier, Ian, Travels in Siberia, Farrar, Straus, and Giroux, 2010. Travelogue in Siberia.
 Portenko, L. A., and Douglas Siegel-Causey. Birds of the Chukchi Peninsula and Wrangel Island = Ptitsy Chukotskogo Poluostrova I Ostrova Vrangelya. New Delhi: Published for the Smithsonian Institution and the National Science Foundation, Washington, D.C., by Amerind, 1981. 

Peninsulas of Russia
Landforms of Chukotka Autonomous Okrug
Landforms of the Chukchi Sea
Peninsulas of Asia
Beringia